Klubi i Futbollit Tirana Under-21 (KF Tirana U-21) is an Albanian football club based in the country's capital city, Tirana. The under-21 football club is part of the multi-disciplinary sports club SK Tirana, and is a feeder team of the senior side, KF Tirana. They play their home games at the Skënder Halili Complex in Tirana and they play in the Kategoria Superiore U-21.

Players

Squad

Managers
  Johanes Tafaj (1 January 2019 — 11 November 2020 )
 Arber Abilaliaj (12 November 2020 — 07 December 2020 )
  Olsi Uku (12 December 2020 — 25 January 2021 )
 Arber Abilaliaj (26 January 2021 — 30 June 2021  )
 Erbim Fagu (1 July 2021 — 10 June 2022  )
 Gentian Muca (1 August 2022 —   )

Recent seasons

References

External links
KF Tirana official website 
KF Tirana U-21 | FSHF 

Under-21
Reserve team football in Albania
Under-21 association football
Kategoria Superiore U-21